Burrum Coast is a national park in the Bundaberg Region, Queensland, Australia.

A wide diversity of plant and animal species is represented in the park.

Geography 
The park is 281 km north of Brisbane.

The average elevation of the terrain is 17 meters above sea level.

See also

 Protected areas of Queensland

References 

National parks of Queensland
Protected areas established in 1995
Wide Bay–Burnett